The jurors of the Eurovision Song Contest 2010 played a large role in the voting process of the Contest.  Unlike the 2009 Contest which seen used a combination of 50% televoting by the public and 50% by national jury during the final only.  This year the combined results were also used to determine the votes for both the semi-finals.

Background
In response to some broadcasters' continued complaints about politically charged, neighbourly and diaspora voting, the European Broadcasting Union (EBU) evaluated the voting procedure used in the contest, and implemented a change for the 2009 final.  For 2010 the combined voting procedure was extended to determine the results for both the semi-finals.

Jurors
The jurors of the 39 participating countries are as follows:

See also
Eurovision Song Contest 2010
Voting at the Eurovision Song Contest

References

Jurors
Jurors